Isomäki is a Finnish surname.

Isomäki may also refer to:

 Isomäki Areena, an ice hockey arena in Pori, Finland
 Isomäki (Pori), a district of Pori, Finland